"To each according to his contribution" is a principle of distribution considered to be one of the defining features of socialism. It refers to an arrangement whereby individual compensation is representative of one's contribution to the social product (total output of the economy) in terms of effort, labor and productivity. This is in contrast to the method of distribution and compensation in capitalism, an economic and political system in which property owners can receive income by virtue of ownership irrespective of their contribution to the social product.

The concept formed the basic definition of socialism for its pre-Marxist proponents, including Ricardian socialists, classical economists, collectivist anarchists and individualist anarchists, as well as for Marx, who contrasted it with "to each according to his need" as the corresponding principle of completed communism.

Definition and purpose
To each according to his contribution was a concept espoused by many members of the socialist and labor movement. The French socialist Saint-Simonists of the 1820s and 1830s used slogans such as," from each according to his ability, to each ability according to its work" or," From each according to his capacity, to each according to his works.” Other examples of this can be found from Ferdinand Lassalle's and Eugen Dühring's statements to Leon Trotsky's writings. Vladimir Lenin, inspired by Marx's writing on the subject in his Critique of the Gotha Programme, claimed the principle to be a fundamental element of socialism within Marxist theory.

Libertarian socialist thinkers, such as American anarchist Benjamin Tucker, defined socialism as a system whereby the laborer receives the full product of his labor through the elimination of exploitation and accrual of unearned income to a capitalist class.

The term means simply that each worker in a socialist society receives compensation and benefits according to the quantity and value of the labor that they contributed. This translates into workers of great productivity receiving more wages and benefits than workers of average productivity, and substantially more than workers of lesser productivity. An extension of this principle could also be made so that the more difficult one's job is – whether this difficulty is derived from greater training requirements, job intensity, safety hazards, etc. – the more one is rewarded for the labor contributed. The purpose of the principle, as Trotsky would later state, is to promote productivity. This is done by creating incentives to work harder, longer, and more productively. The principle is ultimately a stowaway from capitalism that, according to Marx, will vanish as work becomes more automated and enjoyable, and goods become available in abundance.

Elaboration by Marx

The principle has its roots in the way that capitalism manages its affairs. That is, each is rewarded according to how much he produces. Remuneration increases as the amount of labor contributed increases. However capitalism can lead to a situation where the means of production are owned by a small minority who do not produce, but rather live off the labor of others. Socialism is said to remedy this by putting the means of production in common hands and rewarding individuals according to their contributions.

In the Critique of the Gotha Programme, while criticizing Ferdinand Lassalle's ideas, Marx elaborates on the theory. According to Marx's analysis of the Programme, Lassalle suggests that "the proceeds of labor belong undiminished with equal right to all members of society". While agreeing that the citizens of a workers' society should be rewarded according to individual contributions, Marx claims that giving them the "full product" of their labor is impossible as some of the proceeds will be needed to maintain infrastructure and so forth. He then explains the nature of a communist society in its lower phase (socialist society), which does not emerge from its own foundations "but, on the contrary, .. from capitalist society; [and] thus in every respect, economically, morally, and intellectually, still stamped with the birthmarks of the old society from whose womb it emerges". And so, "accordingly, the individual producer receives back from society – after the deductions have been made – exactly what he gives to it". He explains this as: 

In the paragraph immediately following Marx continues to explain how this system of exchange is related to the capitalist system of exchange:

Marx says that this is rational and necessary, and that once society advances from the early phase of communist society and work becomes life's prime want, distribution will occur differently. During the completed phase of communism, the standard shall be "from each according to his ability, to each according to his needs".

Use by Bolsheviks and Marxist-Leninists
Lenin wrote The State and Revolution to inform the public and to prevent Marxism from becoming tainted by "opportunists" and "reformists", as he called them. The work is very important as it categorizes the "first phase of communist society" as socialism, with the completed phase being communism proper. The pamphlet also answers all questions and concerns of the Marxists of his time by utilizing the classic works of Marxism.

When he is set to describe socialism and its economic features he turns to the authority of Marx, especially the Critique of the Gotha Programme. Lenin claims that socialism will not be perfect since, as Marx said, it has emerged from the womb of capitalism and which is in every respect stamped with the birthmarks of the old society. This society, socialism, will be unable to provide people with total equality, precisely because it is still marked by capitalism. He also explains the difference between the old society and the new as: 

Lenin states that such a society is indeed socialism as it realizes the two principles of socialism "he who does not work, neither shall he eat" and "an equal amount of products for an equal amount of labor".

Joseph Stalin and Leon Trotsky both mentioned the term in their works.

Stalin's most famous use of the concept is in his 1936 Soviet Constitution. He writes that "The principle applied in the U.S.S.R. is that of socialism: From each according to his ability, to each according to his work."
Trotsky's mention is in his famous The Revolution Betrayed. He says that "Capitalism prepared the conditions and forces for a social revolution: technique, science and the proletariat. The communist structure cannot, however, immediately replace the bourgeois society. The material and cultural inheritance from the past is wholly inadequate for that." He goes on to defend his position by saying that "in its first steps the workers’ state cannot yet permit everyone to work "according to his abilities" – that is, as much as he can and wishes to – nor can it reward everyone "according to his needs", regardless of the work he does." And he presents the principle as the method that socialism will use by saying: "In order to increase the productive forces, it is necessary to resort to the customary norms of wage payment – that is, to the distribution of life's goods in proportion to the quantity and quality of individual labor."

See also
Collectivist anarchism
From each according to his ability, to each according to his need
He who does not work, neither shall he eat
Income distribution
Intellectual property
Jedem das Seine
Knowledge worker
Labour voucher
Leninism
Marginal product of labor
Parasitism (social offense)
Pre-Marx socialists
Socialism
Unearned income

References

External links
Capital: Volume I, Marx's socioeconomic analysis of capitalism.
The Critique of the Gotha Programme, the pamphlet from which Lenin draws much of his arguments for the State and Revolution.
The State and Revolution, the complete text of Lenin's main philosophical work.
The Revolution Betrayed, the complete text of Trotsky's most famous and important work.

Political catchphrases
Socialism
Marxian economics
Economic systems
Classical economics